Mesochra is a genus of copepods belonging to the family Canthocamptidae.

The genus has cosmopolitan distribution.

Species:
 Mesochra aestuarii Gurney, 1921 
 Mesochra alaskana Wilson, 1958

References

Harpacticoida
Crustacean genera